Kim Yi-deum (The romanization preferred by the author according to LTI Korea) (Hangul 김이듬; born 1969) is a South Korean poet and university lecturer.

Life 
Kim Yi-deum was born in Jinju, South Korea and raised in Busan. She studied German literature at Pusan National University, and earned her doctoral degree in Korean literature at Gyeongsang National University. She made her literary debut when the quarterly journal Poesie published “The Bathtubs” (욕조 a에서 달리는 욕조 A를 지나) and six other poems in its Fall 2001 Issue. Her poems have attracted attention for their sensual imagination and violence.

Kim was a radio host for “Kim Yi-deum’s Monday Poetry Picks” (김이듬의 월요시선), which aired on KBS Radio Jinju. In 2012, she spent a semester at the Free University of Berlin as a writer in residence, sponsored by Arts Council Korea. Based on her experience there, she wrote her fourth poetry collection Bereulin, dalemui norae (베를린, 달렘의 노래 Song of Berlin, Dahlem), published by Lyric Poetry and Poetics in 2013. She also participated in the International Writing Program at the University of Iowa.

Writing 
Kim Yi-deum’s poetry collections include: Byeol moyangui eoluk (별 모양의 얼룩 A Stain in the Shape of a Star); Cheer up, Femme Fatale (명랑하라 팜 파탈); Malhal su eopneun aein (말할 수 없는 애인 Inexpressible Love); Bereulin, dalemui norae (베를린, 달렘의 노래 Song of Berlin, Dahlem); and Histeria (히스테리아 Hysteria). She also has a novel, Bleodeu sisteojeu (블러드 시스터즈 Blood Sisters). She currently teaches at Gyeongsang University.

Kim’s poetry in translation has appeared in the British journal Modern Poetry in Translation (MPT)’s winter 2016 issue, “The Blue Vein: Focus on Korean Poetry.” In 2016, her first poetry collection in English translation Cheer up, Femme Fatale was published by Action Books. Translated from the Korean by Ji Yoon Lee, Don Mee Choi, and Johannes Göransson, the work was selected as a finalist for the 2017 Best Translated Book Award and the 2017 Lucien Stryk Asian Translation Prize. In 2017, more of her poems in English translation were published by Vagabond Press as part of Poems of Kim Yideum, Kim Haengsook & Kim Min Jeong.

Kim’s poems are known for their grotesque and provocative motifs. Her narrators are often schizophrenic or have multiple personalities, disrupting the existing world order. Many of her poems feature single mothers, prostitutes, people with disabilities, divorced women, queer people, mental patients, beggars, the elderly poor, and other minority groups. She observes the order governing their marginalized world and seeks new artistic possibilities through it. She condemns unreasonable social conventions using language that might be described as hysterical, destructive, vengeful, and rebellious. Apart from such themes, the strong eroticism in her poetry is considered to have made important contributions to Korean women’s poetry.

Work 
Poetry Collections

1. 『별 모양의 얼룩』(천년의시작, 2005) { A Stain in the Shape of a Star. Poem Sijak, 2005. }

2. 『명랑하라 팜 파탈』(문학과지성사, 2007) { Cheer up, Femme Fatale. Moonji, 2007. }

3. 『말할 수 없는 애인』(문학과지성사, 2011) { Inexpressible Love. Moonji, 2011. }

4. 『베를린, 달렘의 노래』(서정시학, 2013) { Song of Berlin, Dahlem. Lyric Poetry and Poetics, 2013. }

5. 『히스테리아』(문학과지성사, 2014) { Hysteria. Moonji, 2014. }

Essay Collections

1. 『모든 국적의 친구』(난다, 2016) { Friends of Every Nationality. Nanda, 2016. }

2. 『디어 슬로베니아』(로고폴리스, 2016) { Dear Slovenia. Logopolis, 2016. }

Critical Essays

1. 『한국현대 페미니즘시 연구』(국학자료원, 2015) { Study on Modern Korean Feminist Poetry. Kookhak, 2015. }

Novels

1. 『블러드 시스터즈』(문학동네, 2011) { Blood Sisters. Munhakdongne, 2011. }

Works in translation 

1. Cheer Up, Femme Fatale (Action Books, 2016) (English)

2. Poems of  Kim Yideum, Kim Haengsook & Kim Min Jeong (Vagabond Press, 2017) (English)

Awards 
1. 2011: 7th Kim Daljin Changwon Literary Award

2. 2014: 7th Poet’s Square: Poem of the Year Prize

3. 2015: 1st 22nd Century Poetry Award

4. 2015: Kim Chunsu Poetry Award

Further reading 
1. 이기성, ｢난파된 신화와 쎄이렌의 변성｣, 『창작과비평』 봄호, 2008

Lee, Ki-seong. “Wrecking of Myth and Changing of the Siren’s Voice.” Changbi, Spring 2008 Issue.

2. 김미정, ｢녹슨 스프링 위의 그녀｣, 『시와세계』 가을호, 2011.

Kim, Mi-jeong. “The Woman on the Rusted Spring.” Poetry & World, Fall 2011 Issue.

3. 이성혁, ｢수난받는 자궁에서 저항하는 자궁에로｣, 『작가세계』 겨울호, 2015

Lee, Seong-hyeok. “From Persecuted Womb to Resisting Womb.” Writer’s World, Winter 2015 Issue.

4. 김주리, ｢김이듬 연보｣, 『작가세계』 겨울호, 2015

Kim, Ju-ri. “Chronology of Kim Yi-deum.” Writer’s World, Winter 2015 Issue.

External links 
 시인 김이듬, 건강한 백치의 관능과 용서 { “Poet Kim Yi-deum, the Sensuality and Mercy of Healthy Innocence.” Channel Yes. }

References 

Living people
1969 births
21st-century South Korean poets
South Korean women poets
21st-century South Korean women writers
Pusan National University alumni
People from Jinju